Yenidoğan (Turkish: "newborn") may refer to the following places in Turkey:

 Yenidoğan, Aralık, a village in the district of Aralık, Iğdır Province
 Yenidoğan, Kozluk, a village in the district of Kozluk, Batman Province
 Yenidoğan, Polatlı, a village in the district of Polatlı, Ankara Province
 Yenidoğan, Silvan
 Yenidoğan, Söke, a town in the district of Söke, Aydın Province
 Yenidoğan, Sur